The 2011 Weber State Wildcats football team represented Weber State University in the 2011 NCAA Division I FCS football season. The Wildcats were led by seventh year head coach Ron McBride and played their home games at Stewart Stadium. They are a member of the Big Sky Conference. They finished the season 5–6, 5–3 in Big Sky play to finish in a tie for third place.

Schedule

References

Weber State
Weber State Wildcats football seasons
Weber State Wildcats football